No Limits is the 2004-05 FIRST Lego League challenge theme. It focused on solutions for aiding people with physical disabilities. The year's theme was introduced by the story Late for Lunch by James Patrick Kelly, which the described the life of a disabled child.

Project
Teams were tasked with selecting a public facility and determining how accessible it is. From this, they would create an innovative solution to improve its accessibility. At competition, teams presented their research and solution to judges.

Gameplay
The table performance portion of No Limits is played on a 4 ft by 8 ft field rimmed by wood boards. At competition, two of these fields are placed together to form an 8 ft square. In each -minute match, a team competes on each field with their robot to earn points manipulating the mission models.

One of the mission models, Play ball, straddles both fields in the center. 50 points are earned by the team whose color of ball is the center goal. The touch penalty objects are balls colored red and blue; 8 exist of each color. They are worth 5 points each (regardless of color) if they are on your side of the Play Ball basket, and worth 2 points if they are on your playing field. Balls that are not in the basket are subject to the touch penalty and one is removed from your field each time the robot is touched outside of base.

Missions

All the missions of No Limits focus on aiding the disabled:
 Put the CD away - up to 40 points
 Play ball (center goal) - 50 points
 Play ball (basket) - up to 80 points
 Climb the stairs - up to 45 points
 Feed the pets - up to 45 points
 Open the gate - up to 35 points
 Read the bus route signs - 35 points
 Push in the chairs - up to 30 points
 Serve dinner - up to 45 points
 Remove the glasses - 40 points

Notes

References

FIRST Lego League games
2004 in robotics